Kingennie is a village in Angus, Scotland, two miles north of Monifieth. It is mostly known for the Forbes Of Kingennie holiday and golf resort.

References

Villages in Angus, Scotland